Richard Leslie Thompson, also known as Sadaputa Dasa (February 4, 1947 – September 18, 2008), was an American mathematician, author and Gaudiya Vaishnava religious figure. Historian Meera Nanda described him as a driving intellectual force of 'Vedic creationism' as co-author (with Michael Cremo) of Forbidden Archeology: The Hidden History of the Human Race (1993), a work that has attracted significant criticism from the scientific community. Thompson also published several books and articles on the relationship between religion and science, Hindu cosmology and astronomy. He was a member of the International Society for Krishna Consciousness (popularly known as the Hare Krishna movement or ISKCON) and a founding member of the Bhaktivedanta Institute, the branch of ISKCON dedicated to examining the relationship of modern scientific theories to the Vaishnava worldview. In the 'science and religion' community he was known for his articulation of ISKCON's view of science. Danish historian of religion Mikael Rothstein described Thompson as "the single dominating writer on science" in ISKCON whom ISKCON has chosen to "cover the field of science more or less on his own".  C. Mackenzie Brown, professor of religion at Trinity University, San Antonio, Texas, described him as "the leading figure" in ISKCON's critique of modern science.

Biography
Richard L. Thompson was born in Binghamton, New York, in 1947. In 1974 he received a Ph.D. in mathematics from Cornell University. In the same year he formally became a member of ISKCON, receiving spiritual initiation from ISKCON's founder, A. C. Bhaktivedanta Swami Prabhupada, and adopting the spiritual name Sadaputa Dasa. Thompson carried out research in the fields of statistical mechanics, probability theory, and mathematical biology. He published scholarly articles in refereed journals and series, such as Journal of the International Association for Mathematical Geology, Remote Sensing of Environment, Biosystems, and International Review of Cytology. In 1976 he became a founding member of the Bhaktivedanta Institute, the scientific branch of ISKCON dedicated to examining the relationship of modern scientific theories to Swami Prabhupada’s Vaishnava worldview. Soon after joining ISKCON, Thompson became "ISKCON's dominating figure in science" and "established himself as the leading figure in the movement's critique of modern science in the light of Vedic spiritual (or 'higher-dimensional') science." He formulated ISKCON's view on the concept of "higher-dimensional science" and wrote extensively on scientific subjects from this perspective.  In support of ISKCON's theology, he made research and analysis of the relation between the Vaishnava theological worldview and  modern science. 

Thompson died of a heart attack on September 18, 2008.

Forbidden Archeology

The coauthor Michael Cremo writes in the Preface to the first edition, that the work's central claim, that anomalous paleontological evidence dating in many hundreds of thousands of years with examples such as the Laetoli footprints (generally considered by paleontologists to have been made by bipedal hominins) potentially stretching possibilities toward the low millions, suggests that modern human beings "perhaps ... coexisted with more apelike creatures," and that the scientific establishment, influenced by confirmation bias, has suppressed fossil evidence of extreme human antiquity. This argument has been criticised by mainstream scholars from a variety of disciplines.

Selected bibliography

Books

Papers and other professional works

See also
Hindu views on evolution
Quantum mysticism

Notes

References

Further reading

External links
 Biography from an official website associated with the Bhaktivedanta Institute
 Richard L.Thompson Archives

1947 births
2008 deaths
20th-century American writers
21st-century American writers
American Hare Krishnas
American Hindus
Converts to Hinduism
Cornell University alumni
Hindu creationists
International Society for Krishna Consciousness religious figures
People from Binghamton, New York
Proponents of alternative chronologies